TX3 may refer to:
 Texas's 3rd congressional district
 Texas State Highway 3
 Blue Bird TX3, a schoolbus
 Ford Laser TX3, a compact car
 Slingsby Cadet TX.3, a training glider aircraft